Tachina breviventris is a species of fly in the genus Tachina of the family Tachinidae that is endemic to Brazil.

References

Insects described in 1830
Diptera of South America
Taxa named by Christian Rudolph Wilhelm Wiedemann
Endemic fauna of Brazil
breviventris